The , sometimes translated as The Chronicles of Japan, is the second-oldest book of classical Japanese history. It is more elaborate and detailed than the Kojiki, the oldest, and has proven to be an important tool for historians and archaeologists as it includes the most complete extant historical record of ancient Japan. The Nihon Shoki was finished in 720 under the editorial supervision of Prince Toneri with the assistance of Ō no Yasumaro and presented to Empress Genshō.

The Nihon Shoki begins with the Japanese creation myth, explaining the origin of the world and the first seven generations of divine beings (starting with Kuninotokotachi), and goes on with a number of myths as does the Kojiki, but continues its account through to events of the 8th century. It is believed to record accurately the latter reigns of Emperor Tenji, Emperor Tenmu and Empress Jitō. The Nihon Shoki focuses on the merits of the virtuous rulers as well as the errors of the bad rulers. It describes episodes from mythological eras and diplomatic contacts with other countries. The Nihon Shoki was written in classical Chinese, as was common for official documents at that time. The Kojiki, on the other hand, is written in a combination of Chinese and phonetic transcription of Japanese (primarily for names and songs). The Nihon Shoki also contains numerous transliteration notes telling the reader how words were pronounced in Japanese. Collectively, the stories in this book and the Kojiki are referred to as the Kiki stories.

The tale of Urashima Tarō is developed from the brief mention in Nihon Shoki (Emperor Yūryaku Year 22) that a certain child of Urashima visited Horaisan and saw wonders. The later tale has plainly incorporated elements from the famous anecdote of "Luck of the Sea and Luck of the Mountains" (Hoderi and Hoori) found in Nihon Shoki. The later developed Urashima tale contains the Rip Van Winkle motif, so some may consider it an early example of fictional time travel.

The first translation was completed by William George Aston in 1896 (English), and the latest one by Seyed Benyamin Keshavarz in 2019 (Persian).

Chapters

Chapter 01: (First chapter of myths) Kami no Yo no Kami no maki.
Chapter 02: (Second chapter of myths) Kami no Yo no Shimo no maki.
Chapter 03: (Emperor Jimmu) Kan'yamato Iwarebiko no Sumeramikoto.
Chapter 04:
(Emperor Suizei) Kamu Nunakawamimi no Sumeramikoto.
(Emperor Annei) Shikitsuhiko Tamatemi no Sumeramikoto.
(Emperor Itoku) Ōyamato Hikosukitomo no Sumeramikoto.
(Emperor Kōshō) Mimatsuhiko Sukitomo no Sumeramikoto.
(Emperor Kōan) Yamato Tarashihiko Kuni Oshihito no Sumeramikoto.
(Emperor Kōrei) Ōyamato Nekohiko Futoni no Sumeramikoto.
(Emperor Kōgen) Ōyamato Nekohiko Kunikuru no Sumeramikoto.
(Emperor Kaika) Wakayamato Nekohiko Ōbibi no Sumeramikoto.
Chapter 05: (Emperor Sujin) Mimaki Iribiko Iniye no Sumeramikoto.
Chapter 06: (Emperor Suinin) Ikume Iribiko Isachi no Sumeramikoto.
Chapter 07:
(Emperor Keikō) Ōtarashihiko Oshirowake no Sumeramikoto.
(Emperor Seimu) Waka Tarashihiko no Sumeramikoto.
Chapter 08: (Emperor Chūai) Tarashi Nakatsuhiko no Sumeramikoto.
Chapter 09: (Empress Jingū) Okinaga Tarashihime no Mikoto.
Chapter 10: (Emperor Ōjin) Homuda no Sumeramikoto.
Chapter 11: (Emperor Nintoku) Ōsasagi no Sumeramikoto.
Chapter 12:
(Emperor Richū) Izahowake no Sumeramikoto.
(Emperor Hanzei) Mitsuhawake no Sumeramikoto.
Chapter 13:
(Emperor Ingyō) Oasazuma Wakugo no Sukune no Sumeramikoto.
(Emperor Ankō) Anaho no Sumeramikoto.
Chapter 14: (Emperor Yūryaku) Ōhatsuse no Waka Takeru no Sumeramikoto.
Chapter 15:
(Emperor Seinei) Shiraka no Take Hirokuni Oshi Waka Yamato Neko no Sumeramikoto.
(Emperor Kenzō) Woke no Sumeramikoto.
(Emperor Ninken) Oke no Sumeramikoto.
Chapter 16: (Emperor Buretsu) Ohatsuse no Waka Sasagi no Sumeramikoto.
Chapter 17: (Emperor Keitai) Ōdo no Sumeramikoto.
Chapter 18:
(Emperor Ankan) Hirokuni Oshi Take Kanahi no Sumeramikoto.
(Emperor Senka) Take Ohirokuni Oshi Tate no Sumeramikoto.
Chapter 19: (Emperor Kinmei) Amekuni Oshiharaki Hironiwa no Sumeramikoto.
Chapter 20: (Emperor Bidatsu) Nunakakura no Futo Tamashiki no Sumeramikoto.
Chapter 21:
(Emperor Yōmei) Tachibana no Toyohi no Sumeramikoto.
(Emperor Sushun) Hatsusebe no Sumeramikoto.
Chapter 22: (Empress Suiko) Toyomike Kashikiya Hime no Sumeramikoto.
Chapter 23: (Emperor Jomei) Okinaga Tarashi Hihironuka no Sumeramikoto.
Chapter 24: (Empress Kōgyoku) Ame Toyotakara Ikashi Hitarashi no Hime no Sumeramikoto.
Chapter 25: (Emperor Kōtoku) Ame Yorozu Toyohi no Sumeramikoto.
Chapter 26: (Empress Saimei) Ame Toyotakara Ikashi Hitarashi no Hime no Sumeramikoto.
Chapter 27: (Emperor Tenji) Ame Mikoto Hirakasuwake no Sumeramikoto.
Chapter 28: (Emperor Tenmu, first chapter) Ama no Nunakahara Oki no Mahito no Sumeramikoto, Kami no maki.
Chapter 29: (Emperor Tenmu, second chapter) Ama no Nunakahara Oki no Mahito no Sumeramikoto, Shimo no maki.
Chapter 30: (Empress Jitō) Takamanohara Hirono Hime no Sumeramikoto.

Process of compilation

Background 
The background of the compilation of the Nihon Shoki is that Emperor Tenmu ordered 12 people, including Prince Kawashima, to edit the old history of the empire.

Shoku Nihongi notes that "" in the part of May 720. It means "Up to that time, Prince Toneri had been compiling Nihongi on the orders of the emperor; he completed it, submitting 30 volumes of history and one volume of genealogy".

References
The Nihon Shoki is a synthesis of older documents, specifically on the records that had been continuously kept in the Yamato court since the sixth century. It also includes documents and folklore submitted by clans serving the court. Prior to Nihon Shoki, there were Tennōki and Kokki compiled by Prince Shōtoku and Soga no Umako, but as they were stored in Soga's residence, they were burned at the time of the Isshi Incident.

The work's contributors refer to various sources which do not exist today. Among those sources, three Baekje documents (Kudara-ki, etc.) are cited mainly for the purpose of recording diplomatic affairs. Textual criticism shows that scholars fleeing the destruction of the Baekje to Yamato wrote these histories and the authors of the Nihon Shoki heavily relied upon those sources. This must be taken into account in relation to statements referring to old historic rivalries between the ancient Korean kingdoms of Silla, Goguryeo, and Baekje.

Some other sources are cited anonymously as aru fumi ("; other document), in order to keep alternative records for specific incidents.

Exaggeration of reign lengths
Most scholars agree that the purported founding date of Japan (660 BCE) and the earliest emperors of Japan are legendary or mythical. This does not necessarily imply that the persons referred to did not exist, merely that there is insufficient material available for further verification and study. Dates in the Nihon Shoki before the late 7th century were likely recorded using the Genka calendar system.

For those monarchs, and also for the Emperors Ōjin and Nintoku, the lengths of reign are likely to have been exaggerated in order to make the origins of the imperial family sufficiently ancient to satisfy numerological expectations. It is widely believed that the epoch of 660 BCE was chosen because it is a "xīn-yǒu" year in the sexagenary cycle, which according to Taoist beliefs was an appropriate year for a revolution to take place. As Taoist theory also groups together 21 sexagenary cycles into one unit of time, it is assumed that the compilers of Nihon Shoki assigned the year 601 (a "xīn-yǒu" year in which Prince Shotoku's reformation took place) as a "modern revolution" year, and consequently recorded 660 BCE, 1260 years prior to that year, as the founding epoch.

Kesshi Hachidai
For the eight emperors of Chapter 4, only the years of birth and reign, year of naming as Crown Prince, names of consorts, and locations of tomb are recorded. They are called the Kesshi Hachidai (", "eight generations lacking history") because no legends (or a few, as quoted in Nihon Ōdai Ichiran) are associated with them. Some studies support the view that these emperors were invented to push Jimmu's reign further back to the year 660 BCE. Nihon Shoki itself somewhat elevates the "tenth" emperor Sujin, recording that he was called the Hatsu-Kuni-Shirasu (": first nation-ruling) emperor.

See also
 Iki no Hakatoko no Sho
 Shaku Nihongi
 William George Aston
 Hiromichi Mori
 Historiographical Institute of the University of Tokyo
 International Research Center for Japanese Studies
 Japanese Historical Text Initiative
 Historiography of Japan

Notes

References
(Nihongi / Nihon Shoki texts)
, English translationNihongi: Chronicles of Japan from the Earliest Times to A.D. 697. 2 vols. Kegan Paul. 1972 Tuttle reprint.

 
, original kanbun text; uncommon kanji (incl. ) undisplayed but Norton safeweb OK as of accessdate.
 , searchtext resource to retrieve kanbun text vs. English tr. (Aston) in blocs.
, modern Japanese translation.

(Secondary literature)
 Brownlee, John S. (1997) Japanese historians and the national myths, 1600–1945: The Age of the Gods and Emperor Jimmu. Vancouver: University of British Columbia Press.   Tokyo: University of Tokyo Press. 
Brownlee, John S. (1991). Political Thought in Japanese Historical Writing: From Kojiki (712) to Tokushi Yoron (1712). Waterloo, Ontario: Wilfrid Laurier University Press.

External links
 Searchable version of Aston's translation.

 Nihon Shoki Text (六国史全文) Downloadable lzh compressed file
Nihon Shoki Online English Translations
Manuscript scans at Waseda University Library: , 
 

History books about Japan
Old Japanese texts
8th-century history books
Nara-period works
Japanese mythology
Shinto texts
Nara period
Japanese literature in Classical Chinese
N
720
8th century in Japan
Kanbun